Magnolia Hill is a historic house in Natchez, Mississippi, USA.

History
The house was built from 1834 to 1840 for Alexander Boyd, a physician and planter. It stayed in the Boyd family until 1958. By 1977, it was purchased by William Carl McGehee.

Heritage significance
It has been listed on the National Register of Historic Places since March 30, 1979.

References

Houses on the National Register of Historic Places in Mississippi
Houses completed in 1840
Houses in Adams County, Mississippi
National Register of Historic Places in Adams County, Mississippi